Thomas Joseph Glass (April 29, 1898 – December 15, 1981) was an American Major League Baseball pitcher. He played for the Philadelphia Athletics during the  season.

References

1898 births
1981 deaths
Major League Baseball pitchers
Philadelphia Athletics players
Baseball players from Greensboro, North Carolina